Mamuka Kurashvili (born January 17, 1970) is a brigadier general of the Georgian army and was also Deputy Chief of Joint Staff of the Georgian Armed Forces since May 7, 2009. Prior to that he served as a chief of staff of peacekeeping operations in Georgia's conflict zones in Abkhazia and South Ossetia.

Kurashvili finished faculty of law of Tbilisi State University in 1996 and Moscow Malinovsky Military Academy  in 1999.

After finishing service in the Soviet Army he began his military career in National Guard of Georgia in 1990. He served at various senior positions in Georgian army including Deputy Chief of the National Guard Security Group (1991–1993), Commandant of Tbilisi Military Garrison (2004–2005), Chief of Special Operation Brigade of Ministry of Defense (2005) and Commander of Georgian peacekeeping battalion in structure of the mixed peacekeeping forces in the Georgian–Ossetian conflict zone (2006–2007).

On August 7, 2008, at the beginning of 2008 South Ossetia war Kurashvili informed his Russian counterparts about the imminent military operation before announcing to Rustavi 2 television that Georgian forces were moving to "establish constitutional order in the Ossetian region." He later described his comment as "not authorized by seniors" and "impulsive" and "not prepared". Kurashvili was reprimanded by Georgian Defense Ministry because of the statement. He was wounded during the war.

On October, 28, during the hearings by Georgian parliament special commission, studying the 2008 South Ossetia war, he claimed that Russian peacekeepers positions in South Ossetia were destroyed by the Russian military, and not Georgian artillery shelling.

On May 6, 2009, according to the order of the Minister of Defense of Georgia Mamuka Kurashvili was moved from position of Deputy Head of the General Inspection of Ministry of Defense to Deputy Chief of the Joint Staff of GAF.

On September 2009 to 2011 Army atashe in Ukraine
Kurashvili has been awarded with Vakhtang Gorgasali Order (3rd Rank), Medal for Military Courage and Medal of Military Honor.

References

Generals from Georgia (country)
Generals of the Defense Forces of Georgia
People of the Russo-Georgian War
1970 births
Living people